In number theory, Weyl's inequality, named for Hermann Weyl, states that if M, N, a and q are integers, with a and q coprime, q > 0, and f is a real polynomial of degree k whose leading coefficient c satisfies

for some t greater than or equal to 1, then for any positive real number  one has

This inequality will only be useful when

for otherwise estimating the modulus of the exponential sum by means of the triangle inequality as  provides a better bound.

References
 Vinogradov, Ivan Matveevich (1954). The method of trigonometrical sums in the theory of numbers. Translated, revised and annotated by K. F. Roth and Anne Davenport, New York: Interscience Publishers Inc. X, 180 p.
 

Inequalities
Number theory